Wendy C. Brawley is an American politician. She is a former member of the South Carolina House of Representatives from the 70th District, serving since 2017. She is a member of the Democratic party. She was defeated by Democrat Jermaine Johnson in the 2022 Democratic primary election.

Political career
In January 2020, Brawley endorsed Democratic Senator Elizabeth Warren of Massachusetts for the Presidency of the United States.

In May 2022, she sponsored a bill that would stop schools from sending lunch debts to collection agencies. The bill was passed unanimously in South Carolina House and Senate.

Electoral history

2016 SC Senate
Brawley unsuccessfully sought the Democratic nomination for the South Carolina Senate's 21st district in 2016. Incumbent Darrell Jackson went on to win the general election unopposed.

2017 SC House of Representatives special election
After the death of South Carolina congressman Joseph Neal in February 2017, his District 70 seat became vacant. Brawley finished first in the primary, but did not secure 50% of the vote, and therefore advanced to the runoff. Brawley defeated H. Heath Hill in the runoff and advanced to the general election as the Democratic nominee.

2018 SC House of Representatives
Brawley was the only Democrat to run in 2018, so there was no Democratic primary.

2022 SC House of Representatives
After redistricting following the 2020 United States census, Rep. Jermaine Johnson's House District 80 was merged into House District 70, leading to a contest between Brawley and Johnson. In the June Primary, Johnson garnered 50.11% person of the vote to defeat Brawley by 115 votes.

Personal life
Brawley was born in Queens and currently resides in Hopkins, South Carolina. She is married to her husband, Paul, with whom she has two children: Paul Jr. and Kanita.

References

External links 

 South Carolina Legislature Biography

Living people
1958 births
Democratic Party members of the South Carolina House of Representatives
African-American people in South Carolina politics
21st-century American politicians
University of South Carolina alumni
Webster University alumni
21st-century African-American politicians
20th-century African-American people

Women state legislators in South Carolina